There were 1,322 individuals who were decorated by the Order of the People's hero of Yugoslavia between 1942 and 1973. Many busts and memorials were built in honor of each People's hero. Each of them usually had a bust in his birthplace or at the place of his death. Most of these monuments are built in figurative style, but some of them were completely abstract, for example, monument of Ivo Lola Ribar, built at Glamoč field in 1962.

Large number of People's heroes' busts and monuments in Dalmatia, Slavonia and central Croatia were removed from public places or destroyed during the 1990s as a part of revisionism process. However, monuments of People's heroes are mostly intact in Istria, Hrvatsko Primorje and Hrvatsko Zagorje.

Monument list

See also
People's Heroes of Yugoslavia monuments
People's Heroes of Yugoslavia monuments in Bosnia and Herzegovina
People's Heroes of Yugoslavia monuments in Serbia
List of Yugoslav World War II monuments and memorials
List of World War II monuments and memorials in Bosnia and Herzegovina
List of World War II monuments and memorials in Croatia
List of World War II monuments and memorials in Montenegro
List of World War II monuments and memorials in North Macedonia
List of World War II monuments and memorials in Serbia
List of World War II monuments and memorials in Slovenia

Croatia
Yugoslav culture
People's Heroes of Yugoslavia monuments
War monuments and memorials